Asura nubilalis is a moth of the family Erebidae. It is found on Java.

References

nubilalis
Moths described in 1894
Moths of Indonesia